The State Register of Heritage Places is maintained by the Heritage Council of Western Australia. , 282 places are heritage-listed in the Shire of Harvey, of which nine are on the State Register of Heritage Places.

List
The Western Australian State Register of Heritage Places, lists the following nine state registered places within the Shire of Harvey:

References

Harvey
 
Harvey